Nagla Beech is a village in Firozabad district, Uttar Pradesh, India. It is about 15 km from the Tundla Railway Colony and the Tundla railway junction.

References and external links

 Village Profile

Villages in Firozabad district